Julian Wießmeier (born 4 November 1992) is a German professional footballer who plays as a midfielder for Austrian Bundesliga club SV Ried.

References

External links 
 
 

1992 births
Living people
Footballers from Nuremberg
German footballers
Association football forwards
Germany youth international footballers
1. FC Nürnberg players
1. FC Nürnberg II players
SSV Jahn Regensburg players
SV Wehen Wiesbaden players
SC Austria Lustenau players
SV Ried players
3. Liga players
Bundesliga players
2. Bundesliga players
2. Liga (Austria) players
Austrian Football Bundesliga players
German expatriate footballers
German expatriate sportspeople in Austria
Expatriate footballers in Austria